The women's super heavyweight (+70 kg/154 lbs) Full-Contact category at the W.A.K.O. European Championships 2004 in Budva was the heaviest of the female Full-Contact tournaments but was also the smallest involving just three fighters.  Each of the matches was three rounds of two minutes each and were fought under Full-Contact kickboxing rules.

The gold medal was won by Galina Ivanova from Russia who defeated Daniela Lazzareska from Macedonia in the final by unanimous decision.  The only other contestant in the tournament, Sweden's Caroline Ek, won bronze.

Results

Key

See also
List of WAKO Amateur European Championships
List of WAKO Amateur World Championships
List of female kickboxers

References

External links
 WAKO World Association of Kickboxing Organizations Official Site

W.A.K.O. European Championships 2004 (Budva)